June Appal Recordings is a record label that was founded by Jack Wright and established by Appalshop to record and distribute music of and from central Appalachia. Artists with June Appal include Buell Kazee, Morgan Sexton, Lee Sexton, Carla Gover, and Nimrod Workman. June Appal  distributes compilation recordings taken from the annual Seedtime on the Cumberland festival in Whitesburg, Kentucky.

Catalog

Other Recordings

See also
 Appalshop
 List of record labels

American record labels
Appalachian culture in Kentucky
Folk record labels
American folk music
Old-time music
Whitesburg, Kentucky
1974 establishments in Kentucky